Josef Stejskal (1897–1942) was a Czech theatre director executed by the Germans.

References

1897 births
1942 deaths
Czech theatre directors
Czech resistance members
Resistance members killed by Nazi Germany
Czech people executed by Nazi Germany